Burton Lane Bridge, also known as Sheerer Bridge and Bruce Ford Bridge, was a historic Howe truss located near Martinsville, Morgan County, Indiana. It was built in 1872 by the Massillon Iron Bridge Company.  It was a single span bridge measuring 99 feet long and 16 feet wide. It was destroyed by an overweight dump truck in May, 1997.

It was listed on the National Register of Historic Places in 1997 and delisted in 2004.

References

Former National Register of Historic Places in Indiana
Bridges completed in 1872
Transportation buildings and structures in Morgan County, Indiana
Road bridges in Indiana
Howe truss bridges in the United States
1872 establishments in Indiana